Richard Small Ayer (October 9, 1829 – December 14, 1896) was a U.S. Representative from Virginia.

Early and family life
Born in Montville, Maine, Ayer attended the common schools.

Career
Ayer farmed and worked as a merchant for several years.  During the Civil War, Ayers enlisted in 1861 in the Union Army as a private in Company A, Fourth Regiment, Maine Volunteer Infantry.  He was later promoted to first lieutenant and was mustered out as a captain on March 22, 1863, for disability.

Ayer settled in Virginia's Northern Neck in 1865 near Warsaw. In 1867, voters elected him a delegate to the Virginia Constitutional Convention of 1868, which was necessary for the Commonwealth to be readmitted to the Union since its prior constitution permitted slavery. Voters overwhelmingly ratified the new Constitution presented by the convention in 1869, and Virginia was readmitted to the Union. Later that year, voters elected Ayer as a Republican to the Forty-first Congress. He defeated Conservative Joseph Eggleton Segar (whom the U.S. Congress had refused to seat the previous two sessions and again unsuccessfully claimed a seat in this Congress) as well as Independents Daniel M. Norton (an African American aligned with the Readjuster Party who also had served in that constitutional convention and would serve in the Virginia Senate) and George W. Lewis. Ayer served from January 31, 1870, until March 3, 1871. However, he was not a candidate for renomination in 1870. Former Confederate veteran and Democrat John Critcher was elected and served one term.

Ayer returned to farming, as well as moved back to Montville, Maine. He later ran for election there and served as member of the State house of representatives in 1888.

Death and legacy
Ayer died in Liberty, Maine, December 14, 1896.  He was interred in Mount Repose Cemetery, Montville, Maine.

References

Sources

1829 births
1896 deaths
People from Montville, Maine
Union Army officers
Republican Party members of the United States House of Representatives from Virginia
People of Maine in the American Civil War
Members of the Maine House of Representatives
People from Richmond County, Virginia
19th-century American politicians